Athabasca-Barrhead-Westlock is a current provincial electoral district in Alberta, Canada. The district is one of 87 districts mandated to return a single member (MLA) to the Legislative Assembly of Alberta using the first past the post method of voting. It was contested for the first time in the 2019 Alberta election.

Geography
The district is located in northern Alberta, containing the communities of Swan Hills, Barrhead, Westlock, Athabasca, and Smoky Lake. It stretches east into part of St. Paul County. Major transportation routes include Alberta Highways 2, 18, 28, and 33 (Grizzly Trail).

History

The district was created in 2017 when the Electoral Boundaries Commission recommended consolidating four electoral districts into three in northeastern Alberta, placing most of Barrhead-Morinville-Westlock and Athabasca-Sturgeon-Redwater, along with a small part of Lac La Biche-St. Paul-Two Hills, into the new district. The Commission recommended naming the district Athabasca-Barrhead, but the Assembly decided to retain Westlock in the name. In 2017, the Athabasca-Barrhead-Westlock electoral district had a population of 46,920, which was slightly above the provincial average of 46,803 for an provincial electoral district.

The district first elected United Conservative MLA Glenn van Dijken who had previously been elected to Barrhead-Morinville-Westlock as a Wildrose candidate in 2015. Glenn van Dijken defeated his next closest challenger NDP candidate, day home operator and former Smoky Lake councillor Therese Taschuck by over 12,000 votes.

Electoral results

2019 general election

See also
List of Alberta provincial electoral districts

References

External links
Elections Alberta
The Legislative Assembly of Alberta

Alberta provincial electoral districts
Athabasca, Alberta
Barrhead, Alberta
Westlock County
2017 establishments in Alberta
Constituencies established in 2017